The Palace Theatre (previously known as the Loew's Theatre, Loew's United Artist Theatre and the United Artists Theatre, it is locally known as the Louisville Palace) is a music venue in downtown Louisville, Kentucky, located in the city's theater district, on the east side of Fourth Street, between Broadway and Chestnut Street. It has a seating capacity of 2,800 people and is owned by Live Nation.  The historic landmark opened on September 1, 1928, and was designed by architect John Eberson. It was originally known as the Loew's and United Artists State theatre.

The Palace exhibits a Spanish Baroque motif with arcades, balconies and turrets. Cobalt blue, bursts of red and gold indirectly light all of the niches, coves and entrances. Above is a curved, vaulted ceiling with 139 sculptures of the faces of historical figures. The theater room inside The Palace is heavily ornamented and displays an imitation nighttime sky on the ceiling.

The theater is two stories with a floor and a balcony.  Both floors contain bars that run the width of the building behind the theater, separated by a grand lobby of intricate art and architecture.

Although the exterior had fallen behind the interior, the Palace was re-dedicated in 1994 and is now a premiere venue.

Its uncommon appearance has made it a popular venue for musicians to record live performances (including Third Day & Alison Krauss).  On June 2, 1983, British group A Flock Of Seagulls performed at the Palace and the show was recorded for broadcast by NBC's The Source. The theatre features an array of popular movies, old and new, as well as concerts by popular artists.

Kentucky musicians that have performed at the Palace include: Billy Ray Cyrus in 1994, the Backstreet Boys in 1998 (Brian and Kevin are from Lexington), My Morning Jacket (from Louisville) in 2005, Chris Stapleton in 2015, Sturgill Simpson in 2016, and Jack Harlow in 2021. Southern Indiana's John Mellencamp played there in 2011. Nashville's Kings of Leon played in 2009, and Paramore in 2015. Nashville bluegrass group Old Crow Medicine Show played there in 2008. Robert Plant performed with bluegrass singer Alison Krauss for 2 nights in 2008. Virginia's Dave Matthews played there in 1999.  Frank Sinatra performed there in 1941, Ray Charles in 1959, and James Taylor in 1982.

See also
List of attractions and events in the Louisville metropolitan area
List of concert halls
House Of Blues

References

External links

 

Arts venues in Louisville, Kentucky
Cinemas and movie theaters in Kentucky
Concert halls in the United States
Atmospheric theatres
Movie palaces
Live Nation Entertainment
Loew's Theatres buildings and structures
National Register of Historic Places in Louisville, Kentucky
Theatres on the National Register of Historic Places in Kentucky
John Eberson buildings
1927 establishments in Kentucky
Theatres completed in 1927
Spanish Baroque architecture